FLOSS Weekly is a free and open-source software (FLOSS) themed netcast from the TWiT Network. The show premiered on April 7, 2006, and features interviews with prominent guests from the free software/open source community. It was originally hosted by Leo Laporte; his cohost for the first seventeen episodes was Chris DiBona and subsequently Randal Schwartz. In May 2010, Schwartz took over from Laporte as lead host. May 2020 saw Doc Searls take over the host role in episode 578.

Many influential people from the free and open-source community have appeared on the show, including Kent Beck, Ward Cunningham, Miguel de Icaza, Rasmus Lerdorf, Tim O'Reilly, Guido van Rossum, Linus Torvalds, and Jimmy Wales. Show topics are wide in variety, and have for example included ZFS, Mifos, Asterisk, and the OSU Open Source Lab.

History
FLOSS Weekly was started by Leo Laporte, who runs the TWiT podcast network, and Chris DiBona, now the open source program manager at Google. FLOSS is an acronym for Free/Libre Open Source Software. The show was intended to be a weekly interview with the biggest names and influences in open source software. Episode one of FLOSS Weekly appeared on April 7, 2006.

Towards the end of 2006, episodes began to appear less frequently, dropping to a monthly basis. DiBona's newborn baby and commitments at Google were cited as reasons for the show's stagnation, and on the seventeenth episode, Laporte appealed for other co-hosts to share the burden. This was DiBona's final appearance on the show as the host. He returned as a guest for the show's 100th episode.

The show went on an unannounced three-month hiatus, re-appearing on July 20, 2007, with a new co-host, Randal Schwartz, who had previously appeared on the show as a guest. Schwartz went on to take over organizing guests for the show, and restored the show to a predominantly weekly schedule (with occasional gaps from scheduling conflicts or last minute cancellations). Starting with episode 69, Jono Bacon was a somewhat regular co-host, even filling in for Randal when Randal wasn't available.

The show was nominated for the 2009 Podcast Awards in the Technology/Science category.

In May 2010, the show began publishing a video feed (along with many of the rest of the TWiT network shows), and moved to an earlier recording time. As a result of the new recording time, Leo Laporte stepped down as the lead host, and Jono Bacon could no longer regularly co-host.  

In May 2020 Doc Searls took over for Randal Schwartz.

Format
Most episodes feature the primary developer or developers of a particular open source software project. The show is an open discussion, with the host and co-host asking questions about the nature of the project. Typically, the interviewers will ask the guests about the history of the project, and its development model (such as which language it is written in, which version control system is used, and what development environment the author uses). Some shows, such as the interviews with Jon "maddog" Hall and Simon Phipps, are not specific to an open source project, and feature more general topics, such as the philosophy of free and open-source software. Shows begin and end with a brief discussion between the hosts, before and after calling the guest. Often the guests are interviewed via Skype, with Laporte's staff at TWiT being responsible for the audio recording and production. FLOSS Weekly has been supported by advertising and donations. In October 2006, FLOSS Weekly had 31,661 downloads of episode 14.

Hosts and Co-Hosts 
Primary Hosts

 Leo Laporte (April 2006 - June 2009)
 Randal Schwartz (June 2009 - May 2020)
 Doc Searls (May 2022 - Present)

Rotating Co-Hosts

 Katherine Druckman
 Aaron Newcomb
 Dan Lynch
 Simon Phipps
 Jonathan Bennett
 Shawn Powers
 Guillermo Amaral
 Gareth Greenaway
 Joe Brockmeier
 Randi Harper

See also

List of FLOSS Weekly episodes
TWiT.tv

References

External links

Technology podcasts
2006 podcast debuts
Interview podcasts 
Audio podcasts